Alvíss ("All-Wise") was a dwarf in Norse mythology.

Thor's daughter, Þrúðr, was promised in marriage to Alvíss. Thor was unhappy with the match, however, so he devised a plan: Thor told Alvíss that, because of his small height, he had to prove his wisdom. Alvíss agreed, but Thor made his tests last until dawn, when Alviss, because he was a dwarf, was  petrified on being exposed to the sunlight.

See also
Alvíssmál, the poem containing most of the information on Alviss

References

Norse dwarves

sv:Dvärg (mytologi)#Dvärgar med mindre roller